Rehabilitation robotics is a field of research dedicated to understanding and augmenting rehabilitation through the application of robotic devices. Rehabilitation robotics includes development of robotic devices tailored for assisting different sensorimotor functions(e.g. arm, hand, leg, ankle), development of different schemes of assisting therapeutic training, and assessment of sensorimotor performance (ability to move) of patient; here, robots are used mainly as therapy aids instead of assistive devices.  Rehabilitation using robotics is generally well tolerated by patients, and has been found to be an effective adjunct to therapy in individuals with motor impairments, especially due to stroke.

Overview
Rehabilitation robotics can be considered a specific focus of biomedical engineering, and a part of human-robot interaction. In this field, clinicians, therapists, and engineers collaborate to help rehabilitate patients.

Prominent goals in the field include: developing implementable technologies that can be easily used by patients, therapists, and clinicians; enhancing the efficacy of clinician's therapies; and increasing the ease of activities in the daily lives of patients.

History

The International Conference on Rehabilitation Robotics occurs every two years, with the first conference in 1989. The most recent conference was held in June 2019 in Toronto, as part of the RehabWeek. Rehabilitation robotics was introduced two decades ago for patients who have neurological disorders. The people that you will most commonly find using rehabilitation robots are disabled people or therapists. When the rehabilitation robots were created they were not intended to be recovery robots but to help people recognizing objects through touch and for people with nervous system disorder. Rehabilitation robots are used in the recuperation process of disabled patients in standing up, balancing and gait.  These robots must keep up with a human and their movement, therefore in the making of the machine the makers need to be sure that it will be consistent with the progress of the patient. Much rigorous work is put into the design because the robot will work with people who have disabilities and will not be able to react quickly in case something goes wrong.

Function
Rehabilitation robots are designed with applications of techniques that determine the adaptability level of the patient. Techniques include but are not limited to active assisted exercise, active constrained exercise, active resistive exercise, passive exercise, and adaptive exercise. In active assisted exercise, the patient moves his or her hand in a predetermined pathway without any force pushing against it. Active constrained exercise is the movement of the patient's arm with an opposing force; if it tries to move outside of what it is supposed to. Active resistive exercise is the movement with opposing forces.

Over the years the number of rehabilitation robotics has grown but they are very limited due to the clinical trials. Many clinics have trials but do not accept the robots because they wish they were remotely controlled. Having robots involved in the rehabilitation of a patient has a few positive aspects. One of the positive aspects is the fact that you can repeat the process or exercise as many times as you wish. Another positive aspect is the fact that you can get exact measurements of their improvement or decline. You can get the exact measurements through the sensors on the device. While the device is taking a measurement you need to be careful because the device can be disrupted once it is done because of the different movements the patient does to get out. The rehabilitation robot can apply constant therapy for long periods.  In the process of a recovery the rehabilitation robot is unable to understand the patient's needs like a well experienced therapist would. The robot is unable to understand now but in the future the device will be able to understand. Another plus of having a rehabilitation robot is that there is no physical effort put into work by the therapist.

Lately, rehabilitation robotics have been used in training medicine, surgery, remote surgery and other things, but there have been too many complaints about the robot not being controlled by a remote. Many people would think that using an industrial robot as a rehabilitation robot would be the same thing, but this is not true. Rehabilitation robots need to be adjustable and programmable, because the robot can be used for multiple reasons. Meanwhile, an industrial robot is always the same; there is no need to change the robot unless the product it is working with is bigger or smaller. In order for an industrial robot to work it would have to be more adjustable to its new task.

Reasons to use this device
The number of disabled people in Spain had gone up due to aging. This means the number of assistance has gone up. The rehabilitation robot is very popular in Spain because it is an acceptable cost, and there are many people in Spain that has strokes and need assistance afterward. Rehabilitation robotics are very popular with people who have had a stroke because the proprioceptive neuromuscular facilitation method is applied. When you have a stroke your nervous system becomes damage in most cases causing people to have disability for six months after the stroke. The robot would be able to carry out exercises a therapist would carry out but the robot will do some exercises that are not so easy to be carried out by a human being. The pneumatic robot helps people who have had strokes or any other illness that has caused a disorder with their upper limb

A 2018 review on the effectiveness of mirror therapy by virtual reality and robotics for any type of pathology concluded that: 1) Much of the research on second-generation mirror therapy is of very low quality; 2) Evidence-based rationale to conduct such studies is missing; 3) It is not relevant to recommend investment by rehabilitation professionals and institutions in such devices.

Types of Robots
There are primarily two types of robots that can be used for rehabilitation: End-effector based robots & powered exoskeletons. Each system has their own advantages & limitations. End-effector systems are faster to setup & are more adaptable. On the other hand, exoskeletons offer more precise joint isolation & improve gait transparency.

Current Areas of Research
Current robotic devices include exoskeletons for aiding limb or hand movement, enhanced treadmills, robotic arms to retrain motor movement of the limb, and finger rehabilitation devices. Some devices are meant to aid strength development of specific motor movements, while others seek to aid these movements directly. Often robotic technologies attempt to leverage the principles of neuroplasticity by improving quality of movement, and increasing the intensity and repetition of the task.  Over the last two decades, research into robot mediated therapy for the rehabilitation of stroke patients has grown significantly as the potential for cheaper and more effective therapy has been identified.  Though stroke has been the focus of most studies due to its prevalence in North America, rehabilitation robotics can also be applied to individuals (including children) with cerebral palsy, or those recovering from orthopaedic surgery.

An additional benefit to this type of adaptive robotic therapy is a marked decrease in spasticity and muscle tone in the affected arm.  Different spatial orientations of the robot allow for horizontal or vertical motion, or a combination in a variety of planes.  The vertical, anti-gravity setting is particularly useful for improving shoulder and elbow function.

See also

 Hybrid Assistive Limb
 Rehabilitation engineering
 Robotics
 Prosthetics

References

Further reading

Gimigliano F, Palomba A, Arienti C, et al. Robot-assisted arm therapy in neurological health conditions: rationale and methodology for the evidence synthesis in the CICERONE Italian Consensus Conference. Eur J Phys Rehabil Med. 2021 Jun 15. doi: 10.23736/S1973-9087.21.07011-8. Epub ahead of print. PMID 34128606.

External links
International Conference for Rehabilitation Robotics http://icorr2019.org/
Journal of NeuroEngineering and Rehabilitation: http://www.jneuroengrehab.com/
IEEE Robotics and Automation Society special issue on rehabilitation robotics: https://web.archive.org/web/20121022224415/http://www.ieee-ras.org/issue/rehabilitation-robotics.html
IEEE RAS Technical Committee on Rehabilitation & Assistive Robotics.: https://web.archive.org/web/20101204064448/http://tab.ieee-ras.org/committeeinfo.php?tcid=18

Assistive technology
 
Medical robotics